"Footsteps" is a Kim Jong-un propaganda song that appeared before "Onwards Toward the Final Victory". The song was released in 2009 and aired while his father (Kim Jong-il) was alive, before Kim Jong-un had a formal position.

Lyrics

The song is calling to follow "Our General Kim's footsteps".
The song begins:
Tramp tramp tramp
the footsteps of our General Kim
spreading the spirit of February
tramp tramp tramping onwards
According to Yonhap, "General Kim" appears to be a reference to Kim Jong-un and February is a birth month of his father. Additional song lyrics:
Footsteps, Footsteps
spreading out further the sound of a brilliant future ahead
tramp, tramp, tramp, ah, footsteps

See also

 Music of North Korea
 Propaganda in North Korea

References

Further reading

North Korean propaganda songs
Propaganda songs
Propaganda in North Korea
Patriotic songs
2009 songs
Songs about Kim Jong-un